Windcrest is a city in Bexar County, Texas, United States. Its population was 5,865 at the 2020 census. It is part of the San Antonio metropolitan area.

Geography
Windcrest is located in northeastern Bexar County. It is bordered to the north, west, and south by San Antonio and to the east by unincorporated neighborhoods in Bexar County.

Demographics

As of the 2020 United States census, there were 5,865 people, 1,903 households, and 1,317 families residing in the city.

As of the census of 2000, 5,105 people, 2,232 households, and 1,618 families were residing in the city. The population density was 2,808.9 people per square mile (1,083.0/km2). The 2,297 housing units averaged 1,263.9 per square mile (487.3/km2). The racial makeup of the city was 79.00% White, 8.23% African American, 0.31% Native American, 7.10% Asian, 0.20% Pacific Islander, 3.80% from other races, and 1.37% from two or more races. Hispanics or Latinos of any race were 14.93% of the population.

Of the 2,232 households, 16.8% had children under the age of 18 living with them, 62.5% were married couples living together, 8.0% had a female householder with no husband present, and 27.5% were not families. About 24.1% of all households were made up of individuals, and 16.2% had someone living alone who was 65 years of age or older. The average household size was 2.23, and the average family size was 2.59.

In the city, the age distribution was 14.6% under 18, 5.0% from 18 to 24, 15.9% from 25 to 44, 28.0% from 45 to 64, and 36.6% who were 65 or older. The median age was 56 years. For every 100 females, there were 84.3 males. For every 100 females age 18 and over, there were 81.7 males.

Males had a median income of $38,545 versus $32,457 for females. The per capita income for the city was $30,120. About 4.6% of families and 6.5% of the population were below the poverty line, including 19.7% of those under age 18 and 0.4% of those age 65 or over.

Education
The city is served by North East Independent School District. Windcrest Elementary School in Windcrest, Ed White Middle School in San Antonio, and Roosevelt High School in San Antonio serve it.

References

External links

 City of Windcrest official website
 Martinez, Melissa. "Windcrest Neighborhood Profile." About.com.

Cities in Bexar County, Texas
Cities in Texas